Arpan Thapa (born 15 November 1978). is a Nepali actor, director, and scriptwriter.

He studied acting in Mumbai in 2002 before returning to Nepal to start his career in the Nepali film industry. He sold CDs at Mahabouddha, to promote the business of a friend, where he met Murray Kerr, the director.

Thapa began his acting career with the Nepali film Sick City, playing the lead role as Krishna. He has directed the movie Mukhauta , which was released on 13 June 2014.

Thapa cites Daniel Day-Lewis as his inspiration and has expressed respect for other Nepalese actors, including Hari Bansha Acharya and Madan Krishna Shrestha.

Filmography

Director
He has directed several films; Mukhauta in 2014, a drama Aadha Love in 2017, Sunkesari, Ghar in 2019, and the upcoming Teen Jantu in 2020.

References

External links

 

1979 births
21st-century Nepalese male actors
Living people
Actors from Kathmandu
21st-century Nepalese screenwriters